Sutherland Island is an island in Baffin Bay, in Avannaata municipality, off the NW shores of Greenland.

Geography
It is surrounded by ice most of the year.

See also
List of islands of Greenland

References

Islands of Greenland
Avannaata